The National Union of Furniture Trade Operatives (NUFTO) was a trade union in the United Kingdom representing furniture makers.

The union was founded in 1947 by the merger of the National Amalgamated Furnishing Trades Association and the Amalgamated Union of Upholsterers.  By the 1960s, the union was keen to merge with other in its sector; in 1969, it absorbed the United French Polishers' Society, and the following year, the Midland Glass Bevellers' and Kindred Trades' Society joined.

By 1971, the union had 60,754 members and, that year, it merged with the Amalgamated Society of Woodcutting Machinists to form the Furniture, Timber and Allied Trades Union.

Election results
The union sponsored Labour Party candidates in several Parliamentary elections.

General Secretaries
1947–1971: Alf Tomkins

References

Defunct trade unions of the United Kingdom
1947 establishments in the United Kingdom
Furniture industry trade unions
Trade unions established in 1947
Trade unions disestablished in 1971
Trade unions based in London